Roseibium marinum is a Gram-negative, aerobic and halophilic bacterium from the genus Roseibium which has been isolated from seawater from the Yellow Sea in Korea.

References 

Rhodobacteraceae
Bacteria described in 2006